Elachista angularis is a moth of the family Elachistidae. It is found in the United States, where it has been recorded from Maryland, Mississippi and Tennessee.

The wingspan is about 7 mm. The forewings are gray, shading to brownish-black outwardly. There is an angulated white fascia beyond the middle. The hindwings are gray. Adults have been recorded on wing in April and from June to July.

References

angularis
Moths described in 1860
Moths of North America